Frank George "Bill" Belanich (May 19, 1903 – August 13, 1960), also known as "Box Car Bill", was an American football and basketball player and coach. He played college football at Dayton from 1924 to 1926 and was the captain of the 1926 Dayton Flyers football team. He later played professional football in the National Football League (NFL) as a tackle and end for the Dayton Triangles. He appeared in 19 NFL games, 18 as a starter, during the 1927, 1928, and 1929 seasons. He also served as the University of Dayton's basketball coach from 1929 to 1933.

References

1903 births
1960 deaths
Dayton Flyers football players
Dayton Flyers men's basketball coaches
Dayton Triangles players
Players of American football from Ohio